is a former competitive Japanese figure skater. He is the 2011 World silver medalist, a two-time Grand Prix Final medalist, a two-time Four Continents medalist, and the 2010–11 Japanese national champion. He is also the 2006 World Junior champion and the 2005–06 JGP Final champion.

Personal life 
Kozuka was born on February 27, 1989, in Nagoya, Japan. His father, Tsuguhiko Kozuka, competed in singles skating at the 1968 Olympics; his mother, Sachiko, competed in ice dancing; and his grandfather, Mitsuhiko Kozuka, was prominent in early Japanese skating.

Kozuka studied sports education at Chukyo University. His thesis compares jumps performed on the floor to those on the ice. In March 2016, he received a master's degree in physical education. During his competitive career, he worked for Toyota, one of his sponsors, and remained at the company after his retirement from skating.

On July 23, 2015, Kozuka announced his engagement to his girlfriend and Japanese television news presenter, Yukari Oshima. They married in February 2016.

Career 
As both of his parents are coaches, Kozuka stepped onto the ice at age three and began skating seriously at five. He was inspired by Yuka Sato's win at the 1994 World Championships. Nobuo Sato and Kumiko Sato became his coaches when he was in primary school.

Kozuka is known for the quality of his edges and basic skating skills. His coaching team made him practice compulsory figures when he was a child.

Early career 
In the 2005–06 season, Kozuka won the Junior Grand Prix Final, the Japanese Junior Championships, and the World Junior Championships.

2006–07 to 2008–09 
Kozuka debuted on the ISU Grand Prix of Figure Skating series in the 2006–07 season. He won the bronze medal at the 2006 NHK Trophy and placed 6th in the 2006 Trophée Eric Bompard. He placed 6th in the 2006–07 Japanese Championships and 4th in the 2007 Asian Winter Games.

In the 2007–08 season, he won the silver medal at the 2007–08 Japan Championships. He placed 8th at the 2008 Four Continents and 8th at the 2008 Worlds.

In the 2008–09 season, Kozuka won gold at the 2008 Skate America and silver at the 2008 Trophee Eric Bompard. He qualified for the Grand Prix Final where he won the silver medal. Kozuka won another national silver medal at the 2008–09 Japan Championships. He won the bronze medal at the 2009 Four Continents and placed 6th at the 2009 Worlds.

2009–10 season 
In the 2009–10 season, Kozuka won the silver medal at the 2009 Cup of Russia earning 215.13 points and placed seventh in the 2009 NHK Trophy scoring 186.00. He won the bronze medal at the Japanese National Championships with 236.13 points, placing second in the short program and third in the free skate, and thus qualified to compete at the 2010 Winter Olympics and at the 2010 World Championships.

Kozuka finished eighth overall in the men's singles at the 2010 Winter Olympics with 231.19 points. At the 2010 Worlds he finished in tenth position with a total of 216.73 points.

2010–11 season 
Kozuka's assigned events for the 2010–11 ISU Grand Prix season were the 2010 Cup of China and the 2010 Trophée Eric Bompard. He won the 2010 Cup of China with 233.51 points, placing first in both the short program and the free skate. He went on to win the 2010 Trophée Eric Bompard with 248.07, again winning both segments of the competition. He was the top qualifier for the men's event at the 2010–11 Grand Prix Final.

During a practice session at the Grand Prix Final, Kozuka inadvertently collided with Daisuke Takahashi. Both were shaken but went on to compete at the event. Kozuka said, "I apologized to him and he accepted the apology with a smile and claimed that he was not in pain but I still feel awful about it. I promised him and his coach that it will never happen again." Kozuka was fourth in the short program and second in the free skate, and won the bronze medal. He won his first national title in December 2010, placing first in both the short program and the free skate to total 251.93 points. At the 2011 World Championships, he placed sixth in the short program but moved to second overall after the long program and won his first World medal.

2011–present 
Kozuka was assigned to 2011 Skate America and 2011 NHK Trophy for the 2011–12 Grand Prix season, and he won the bronze medal at Skate America and the silver medal at NHK Trophy. Kozuka earned the silver medal at the 2011 Japanese national figure skating championships, thus qualifying for a spot on the Japanese team for the 2012 World Championships, where he finished 11th.

Kozuka began the 2012–13 season by winning gold at the 2012 Skate America and then won silver at the 2012 Rostelecom Cup. He injured his right instep in mid-December 2012. Kozuka finished 5th at the Japan Championships.

In 2013–14, Kozuka earned a bronze medal at the 2013 Cup of China. He placed 3rd at the 2013 Japanese National Championships but was not included in the Japanese team to the Olympics. He was assigned instead to the 2014 Four Continents Championships where he won the silver medal. When Daisuke Takahashi withdrew from the 2014 World Championships, Kozuka replaced him as a substitute and placed 6th at that competition.

In 2014–15, Kozuka placed 8th and 6th, respectively, at Skate Canada and Rostelecom Cup. He placed 6th in the short program at the 2014 Japanese National Championships, but rallied with a second-place free skate to place 3rd overall. He was assigned to the 2015 World Championships, where he finished 12th.

Toward the end of his career, Kozuka had tendinitis in his left ankle. He announced his retirement from skating on March 15, 2016. On April 17, he performed his farewell exhibition program, Epilogue, at the last show of 2016 Stars on Ice Japan in Tokyo. In 2017, he said that he would remain involved in figure skating. He started the Kozuka Skate Academy in 2016 and also works as a skating commentator for Fuji TV.

Programs

Competitive highlights 
GP: Grand Prix; JGP: Junior Grand Prix

Detailed results
Small medals for short and free programs awarded only at ISU Championships.

Senior results

Junior results

References

External links

 
 

! colspan="3" style="border-top: 5px solid #78FF78;" |World record holder

1989 births
Living people
Japanese male single skaters
Figure skaters from Nagoya
Figure skaters at the 2010 Winter Olympics
Olympic figure skaters of Japan
World Figure Skating Championships medalists
Four Continents Figure Skating Championships medalists
World Junior Figure Skating Championships medalists
Figure skaters at the 2007 Asian Winter Games
Universiade medalists in figure skating
Universiade silver medalists for Japan
Competitors at the 2015 Winter Universiade